Kimberly is the name of several unincorporated communities in the U.S. state of West Virginia.

Kimberly, Fayette County, West Virginia
Kimberly, Monongalia County, West Virginia